Acromantis formosana, known as the Taiwan flower mantis, is a species of mantis native to Taiwan.

Description
The female, as in other flower mantises is larger than the male. The nymph is mid to dark brown with flanged and spined extensions to its abdomen, disrupting its outline to provide excellent camouflage on dead leaves. The adult has a long narrow thorax and green wings.

See also
 List of mantis genera and species
 Flower mantis

References

formosana
Mantodea of Southeast Asia
Endemic fauna of Taiwan
Insects of Taiwan
Insects described in 1911